Keyoh is a Dakelh word meaning (ᗸᘏᑋ, territory, village, trapline). It is the principal traditional area of which a certain indigenous corporate family group has customary use, occupancy, governance, stewardship and ownership rights. It is applied to designate areas such as countries and settlements such as towns and a trapline in the non-native sense, that is the area within which a certain person has the right to trap, but the common translation "trapline" is misleading both in that it is not restricted to the right to trap and it is independent of the provincial system of trapline registration. Indeed, one source of disparity between provincially registered traplines and keyoh, is that provincially registered traplines are held by a single individual who for many years had to be male, while keyoh are held corporately, with its hereditary chief also being strongly patrilineal.  The hereditary chief of a Keyoh is known as the keyoh-whudachun, Keyoh Holder or noble. The term keyoh is used in reference to Indigenous rights as on the web site of the Maiyoo Keyoh

Keyohs predate the Canadian Indian Act statutory creations of Indian Bands, such as Nak'azdli Band, and keyohs continue to persist to the present.

The word takes the form keyah in the more western dialects.

It is also the name of one of the student residence halls at the University of Northern British Columbia. UNBC defines Keyoh as "our community", and Neyoh, the name of another hall, as "our home"

References

External links
Keyoh Huwunline
Fraser Fort George Regional Museum
Keyoh Aboriginal Interests

Dakelh
Land management
Forest governance
Customary legal systems
Fur trade